Zoran Ljubinković ( born 4 July 1982) is a Serbian former professional footballer, and now Head coach in FK BASK.

Club career
Ljubinković started out at Spartak Subotica, making his senior debut in 1999, aged 17. He was transferred to Belgian club Royal Antwerp in the 2002 winter transfer window. In the following years, Ljubinković played for numerous sides in his homeland, including Zemun, Spartak Subotica, Mladost Apatin, Smederevo, Radnički Niš (twice), Inđija, and Rad. He also played for three Romanian clubs, namely Petrolul Ploiești, Oțelul Galați (making his UEFA Champions League debut in 2011–12), and Universitatea Craiova. In 2019, Ljubinković briefly played for Kolubara, before retiring from the game. After finishing his career, he becomes the U-19 coach at FK Rad.International career
Ljubinković represented FR Yugoslavia at the 2001 UEFA European Under-18 Championship.

Statistics

Honours
Petrolul Ploiești
 Liga II: 2010–11
Oțelul Galați
 Supercupa României: 2011
Universitatea Craiova
 Liga II: 2013–14

Notes

References

External links

Teams managed as Youth coach
 Fk Rad U12-2018
 Fk Rad U17-2019
 Fk Rad U19-2020,2021,2022

Teams managed as senior Head coach
 OFK Žarkovo-2022
 FK BASK

ASC Oțelul Galați players
Association football defenders
Belgian Pro League players
CS Universitatea Craiova players
Expatriate footballers in Belgium
Expatriate footballers in Romania
FC Petrolul Ploiești players
First League of Serbia and Montenegro players
FK Inđija players
FK Kolubara players
FK Mladost Apatin players
FK Rad players
FK Radnički Niš players
FK Smederevo players
FK Spartak Subotica players
FK Zemun players
Liga I players
Liga II players
Royal Antwerp F.C. players
Serbia and Montenegro footballers
Serbian expatriate footballers
Serbian expatriate sportspeople in Belgium
Serbian expatriate sportspeople in Romania
Serbian First League players
Serbian footballers
Serbian SuperLiga players
Sportspeople from Subotica
1982 births
Living people